Saxman was an unincorporated community in Nicholas County, West Virginia, United States. It has ceased existing totally. The Saxman post office  is also gone.

References

Unincorporated communities in Nicholas County, West Virginia
Unincorporated communities in West Virginia
Coal towns in West Virginia